Direct presidential elections were held in Chad for the first time on 15 June 1969. Previously the President had been elected by an electoral college, but in an attempt mobilise support, incumbent François Tombalbaye initiated direct elections. The country was a one-party state at the time, with the Chadian Progressive Party as the sole legal party and Tombalbaye ran unopposed. Voter turnout was 93.0%.

Results

References

Chad
Presidential election
Presidential elections in Chad
One-party elections
Single-candidate elections
Chadian presidential election